These are the official results of the Women's marathon event at the 1990 European Championships in Split, Yugoslavia. The race was held on 27 August 1990.

Medalists

Abbreviations
All times shown are in hours:minutes:seconds

Final ranking

Participation
According to an unofficial count, 27 athletes from 16 countries participated in the event.

 (1)
 (1)
 (1)
 (1)
 (3)
 (1)
 (1)
 (2)
 (1)
 (1)
 (1)
 (3)
 (3)
 (1)
 (3)
 (3)

See also
 1987 Women's World Championships Marathon (Rome)
 1988 Women's Olympic Marathon (Seoul)
 1990 Marathon Year Ranking
 1991 Women's World Championships Marathon (Tokyo)
 1992 Women's Olympic Marathon (Barcelona)
 1993 Women's World Championships Marathon (Stuttgart)

References

External links
 Results
 marathonspiegel

Marathon
Marathons at the European Athletics Championships
1990 marathons
Women's marathons
European Athletics Championships marathon